Dashli Daraq (also Romanized as Dāshlī Daraq; also known as Dāshlī Darreh and Dāshtan Darreh) is a village in Salavat Rural District, Moradlu District, Meshgin Shahr County, Ardabil Province, Iran. At the 2006 census, its population was 23, in 6 families.

References 

Towns and villages in Meshgin Shahr County